Artemisia senjavinensis, the arctic wormwood, is a rare Arctic species of plants in the sunflower family. It has been found only on the Seward Peninsula on the Alaskan side of the Bering Strait and on the Chukotka (Chukchi) Peninsula on the Russian side.

Artemisia senjavinensis  is a shrub up to 90 cm (3 feet) tall, with many stems densely clumped together. Leaves are gray-green, woolly, mostly in rosettes close to the ground. There are many small yellow or tan flower heads. The species grows at low elevations near the shore.

References

External links

senjavinensis
Flora of Alaska
Flora of the Russian Far East
Plants described in 1836
Taxa named by Wilibald Swibert Joseph Gottlieb von Besser
Flora without expected TNC conservation status